James Fairbank (18 December 1925 - 16 December 2010) was a sailor from Puerto Rico, who represented his country at the 1968 Summer Olympics in Acapulco, Mexico and the 1976 Summer Olympics in Kingston, Ontario, Canada as crew member in the Soling. With helmsman Juan R. Torruella and fellow crew member Lee Gentil they took the 22nd place.

References

2010 deaths
1925 births
Sailors at the 1976 Summer Olympics – Soling
Sailors at the 1968 Summer Olympics – 5.5 Metre
Olympic sailors of Puerto Rico
Puerto Rican male sailors (sport)
20th-century Puerto Rican people